Richard J. Fuller (2 March 1913 – 1983) was an English footballer who played at centre-forward for Stockport County and Port Vale.

Career
Fuller played for Stockport County, before joining Third Division South club Port Vale in May 1938. His only game for the club was on 28 January 1939, in a 2–0 defeat by Mansfield Town at Field Mill. Failing to make an impression at The Old Recreation Ground, he left on a free transfer in April 1939. During the war he guested for Doncaster Rovers and Darlington.

Career statistics
Source:

References

1913 births
1983 deaths
English footballers
Association football forwards
Stockport County F.C. players
Port Vale F.C. players
Darlington F.C. players
English Football League players